Dorobanți is a commune in Arad County, Romania. Dorobanți commune lies in the Arad Plateau and it stretches over 2780 hectare. It is composed of a single village, Dorobanți, split off from Curtici town in 2004. It is situated at 25 km from Arad.

Population
According to the last census the population of the commune counts 1618 inhabitants. From an ethnical point of view it has
the following structure: 8.59% are Romanians, 89.3% Hungarians and 1.27% are of other or undeclared nationalities.

History
The first documentary record of the locality dates back to 1454.

Economy
The commune's present-day economy can be characterized by a powerful dynamic force with significant developments in
all the sectors present in the commune. Dorobanți is known as an important agricultural centre of the region.

References

Communes in Arad County
Localities in Crișana